Fortyville is an extinct town in Lafayette County, in the U.S. state of Missouri.

The community took its name from its main thoroughfare, U.S. Route 40.

References

Ghost towns in Missouri
Former populated places in Lafayette County, Missouri